Julian Lake is a lake in western Quebec, Canada, situated east of Hudson Bay.

Lakes of Nord-du-Québec